Michael Austin Wardlow (born January 19, 1988) is an American professional wrestler. He is currently signed to All Elite Wrestling (AEW) under the mononymous ring name Wardlow. He is most known for formerly being MJF's bodyguard, is a former member of The Pinnacle and former two-time AEW TNT Champion.

Early life 
Michael Wardlow was born in Middlefield, Ohio. He was raised by a single mother and has two older sisters. He has a background in boxing and jujitsu.

Professional wrestling career

Independent circuit (2014–2019) 
Wardlow made his debut on March 15, 2014, for American Revolution Wrestling, where he was defeated by Nickie Valentino. In the following years, Wardlow began to wrestle in other promotions, including the International Wrestling Cartel (IWC). In December 2016, Wardlow won his first championship in professional wrestling, by way of defeating RJ City to capture the vacant IWC Heavyweight Championship. He later won that title twice more. In 2018 Wardlow had a try out for WWE's NXT. He was not offered a position with the company. This led to him spending another year on the indies winning titles before signing with AEW. He won the IWC Super Indy Championship in March 2019, but lost it to Josh Alexander in August of that year. Also in 2019, Wardlow won the Revenge Pro Wrestling World Title.

All Elite Wrestling

Bodyguard of MJF and The Pinnacle (2019–2022) 

At All Elite Wrestling (AEW)'s All Out pay-per-view on August 31, 2019, a video package was aired, promoting Wardlow's impending debut. Wardlow made his debut for AEW on the November 13 episode of Dynamite, attacking Cody. He would then align himself with Cody's rival MJF and become his bodyguard. Wardlow wrestled his AEW debut match on the February 19, 2020 episode of Dynamite, where he lost to Cody in a steel cage match. In October, Wardlow would participate in a tournament to determine the number one contender for the AEW World Championship, defeating Jungle Boy in the first round before ultimately being eliminated by Adam Page in the semi-finals. Following this, Wardlow and MJF would join The Inner Circle faction, also consisting of Chris Jericho, Sammy Guevara, Jake Hager, Santana and Ortiz. However, after months of tension within the group, Wardlow and MJF separated from The Inner Circle in March 2021 to form a new group called The Pinnacle, also made up of Shawn Spears and FTR (Cash Wheeler and Dax Harwood), sparking a feud between the two groups. At the Blood and Guts event on May 5, The Pinnacle defeated The Inner Circle in the inaugural Blood and Guts match. At the Double or Nothing pay-per-view later that month, The Pinnacle were defeated by The Inner Circle in a Stadium Stampede match. On the June 18 episode of Dynamite, Wardlow was defeated by Hager in a MMA rules cage match. On the August 11 episode of Dynamite, Wardlow faced Jericho, but was unsuccessful. On the December 8 episode of Dynamite, Wardlow competed in the Dynamite Dozen Battle Royale, but he was inadvertently eliminated by MJF, thus beginning to tease a face turn due to growing dissension with MJF. Over the following weeks, the tension would continue to grow as Wardlow came into conflict with Shawn Spears, MJF, and other members of the Pinnacle, culminating in the March 2, 2022 episode of Dynamite, where MJF slapped Wardlow in a heated confrontation.

On March 6, 2022, Wardlow competed in, and won, the "Face of the Revolution" ladder match at Revolution. Later that same evening, Wardlow would help CM Punk defeat MJF (after helping MJF cheat his previous victory against Punk) during their Dog Collar match by handing him the Dynamite Diamond Ring, thus turning face. On the following Wednesday's episode of Dynamite, Wardlow cemented his turn in a promo, declaring that he was no longer MJF's bodyguard and no longer a member of the Pinnacle. On the March 16, 2022 episode of Dynamite Wardlow would lose his AEW TNT Championship match to reigning champion Scorpio Sky following interference from MJF and Shawn Spears. Wardlow also had a confrontation with Austin Vanderford, who later assisted MJF and Spears in attacking him after the match ended. Within storyline, Wardlow was not employed by AEW but by MJF, who could forbid him from wrestling him or for AEW altogether. MJF set up stipulations under which he would let him out of the contract, such as being lashed 10 times. On the May 25 episode of Dynamite, Wardlow completed the final stipulation which guaranteed him a match with MJF at the upcoming Double or Nothing pay-per-view by defeating Spears in a steel cage match, with MJF serving unsuccessfully as the special guest referee; should he win, Wardlow would be officially released from his contract with MJF, but would be banned from obtaining a new AEW contract and be required to remain under MJF's employment should he lose. At the event, Wardlow defeated MJF after hitting him with ten consecutive powerbombs to win the match and was freed of his contract; as a result, Wardlow would also earn a new contract which in storyline made him an official member of AEW.

On the June 1, 2022 episode of Dynamite, Wardlow wrestled in his first match as an official member of the AEW roster, defeating J.D. Drake.

TNT Champion (2022–present) 
On the July 6 episode of Dynamite, Wardlow would defeat Scorpio Sky in a street fight match to win the TNT Championship. Wardlow's first defence of the TNT Championship was against Orange Cassidy on 13 July 2022. Wardlow beat Cassidy with his powerbomb finishing move, after catching the challenger midair. On July 29, 2022's episode of Rampage, Wardlow intervened to save Cassidy from an attack by Jay Lethal. On the following episode of Dynamite, Lethal's manager, Sonjay Dutt, challenged Wardlow to defend his TNT Championship against his client. Wardlow accepted the challenge. Wardlow successfully defended the TNT Championship against Lethal at Battle of the Belts III on 6 August, winning with a head butt and power bomb finish. After conclusion of the match, Wardlow was attacked by Sonjay Dutt and Satnam Singh. Despite Wardlow trying to fight back – including an attempt to powerbomb Singh – Singh choke slammed Wardlow through a table. Lethal mocked Wardlow by standing triumphantly with the TNT Championship belt.

Championships and accomplishments
All Elite Wrestling
AEW TNT Championship (2 times)
Face of the Revolution Ladder Match (2022)
 International Wrestling Cartel
 IWC Super Indy Championship (1 time)
 IWC World Heavyweight Championship (3 times)
Super 18 Tournament (2019)
 Pro Wrestling Illustrated
 Faction of the Year (2021) – with The Inner Circle
 Ranked No. 218 of the top 500 singles wrestlers in the PWI 500 in 2021
 Revenge Pro Wrestling
 Revenge Pro World Championship (1 time)

References

External links 
 
 

1988 births
AEW TNT Champions
All Elite Wrestling personnel
American male professional wrestlers
Living people
People from Geauga County, Ohio
Professional wrestlers from Ohio
21st-century professional wrestlers